José Marco Higón (born 22 May 1991) is a Spanish footballer who plays for CD Ebro as a right winger.

Club career
Born in Valencia, Higón joined local Levante UD's youth academy in 2004, aged 13. Six years later he was promoted to the reserve team, playing in Tercera División.

On 27 October 2010, Higón made his first-team debut in a Copa del Rey match against Xerez CD, starting and playing 77 minutes in a 3–2 away win (4–4 aggregate success). He first appeared in La Liga on 7 January 2012, coming on as a substitute for Nabil El Zhar for the last 12 minutes of a 0–0 home draw against RCD Mallorca.

After leaving the Estadi Ciutat de València, Higón competed exclusively in his country's lower leagues. The exception to this was in the 2014–15 season, when he appeared rarely for Cypriot First Division club Doxa Katokopias FC before returning to his homeland.

References

External links

1991 births
Living people
Spanish footballers
Footballers from Valencia (city)
Association football wingers
La Liga players
Segunda División B players
Tercera División players
Cypriot First Division players
Atlético Levante UD players
Levante UD footballers
UD Alzira footballers
CD Torrevieja players
CE L'Hospitalet players
CF Peralada players
Coruxo FC players
CD Badajoz players
UCAM Murcia CF players
UD Melilla footballers
CD Ebro players
Spanish expatriate footballers
Spanish expatriate sportspeople in Cyprus
Expatriate footballers in Cyprus